The Kulm Cross was a Prussian award. It was a version of the badge of the Iron Cross. It was created on 4 December 1813 by Frederick William III of Prussia after the battle of Kulm. It was not awarded for any special act of courage or merit. Officers wore it in silver and NCOs and other ranks in metal. It was worn on the tunic, with no ribbon.

A Russian version of the order was completely identical in size and shape to the Prussian Order of the Iron Cross, differing only in that it had no date and monogram of the king. By awarding this cross 12,066 people were represented, but the reward could only be obtained by 7,131 soldiers who survived to 1816.

Recipients 

 Władysław Grzegorz Branicki
 Leopold I of Belgium
 Aleksandr Mirkovich
 Ivan Nabokov
 Alexey Fyodorovich Orlov

Bibliography 
 Jörg Nimmergut: Das eiserne Kreuz 1813–1939. Deutsches Ordensmuseum, Lüdenscheid 1990. (Gegenwart und Geschichte des Auszeichnungswesens, Teil 3.)

External links 
 Historischer-service
 Telenet-users

Napoleonic Wars
Military awards and decorations of Prussia